Western Circus is a Lucky Luke comic written by Goscinny and illustrated by Morris. It was originally published in French by Dargaud in the year 1970. English editions of this French series have been published by Dargaud.

The proprietor of the Western Circus has been modeled after actor W.C. Fields.

Synopsis 
Zilch, rich organizer of a great annual rodeo, sees in the arrival of the Western Circus a harmful competition. He hires Rattlesnake Joe, a hit man, to put an end to it. In the end, the villainous Zilch and the kind director of the circus become partners and make a successful tour of Europe.

Characters 

 Zilch: The owner of the rodeo
 Erasmus Mulligan: Owner of the circus.
 Vanessa Mulligan: the owner's wife, a trapeze artist.
 Daphne Mulligan: daughter of the owner, a knife thrower. 
 Zippy Kilroy (Zip): the owner's son-in-law, a clown.
 Andy: An Indian elephant.
 Nestor: A one-eyed lion who is always calm, except when nervous.
 Jules Framboise: French businessman.

References

 Morris publications in Spirou BDoubliées

External links
Lucky Luke official site album index 
Goscinny website on Lucky Luke

Comics by Morris (cartoonist)
Lucky Luke albums
1970 graphic novels
Works by René Goscinny
Cultural depictions of W. C. Fields